Andrew Gray-Ling (born 1970), better known as Andy Gray, is a British songwriter, composer, and record producer. Gray became one half of the Perfecto remix team with Paul Oakenfold to replace Steve Osborne, and they went on to remix Moby's "Natural Blues" and U2's "Beautiful Day" and compose the theme music for Big Brother UK under the name Elementfour.

Discography

Film scores
Hunters (2016 TV series)  (composer/ producer) 
Alleycats  (composer)
Mr. Holmes  (composer / producer) Trailer
Last Waltz  (composer)  TBA
Rapid intervention  (composer) 
TT3D: Closer to the Edge  (composer/ producer) 
CSI Miami (composer) original song
Saab (composer / producer) Saab North America
The Secret of war (BBC) (composer / producer) UK TV End credits
Traveler (composer / producer) Pilot TV show US
Ultraviolet (composer / producer) Trailer
I am number four (Disney) (composer / producer) Trailer
Let Me in (composer / producer) Trailer
Toshiba (composer / producer) commercial (hello Tosh)
Victims (TBA) (composer / producer)
Big Brother (Channel 4 TV UK)	(composer / producer) Original Theme
Timecop 2: The Berlin Decision (composer / producer) 
Hollywood Homicide (Sony) (composer / producer) original song
Riders (Miramax) (composer / producer) 
Steal (composer / producer)	
Zoolander (Paramount) (remixer) Song ("Relax") 
 The Bourne Identity (Composer) Mini Chase
 Stormbreaker – Sync (ready steady Go)
 Collateral -Sync (ready steady Go)
Swordfish (composer / producer) End Theme
Get Carter (Warner Bros.) (composer / producer) original track
Oakenfold & Gray (composer / producer) Toyota commercial 
												("Gorilla")
K2 (programmer) Hans Zimmer Score

Music
Andy Gray /Gary Numan For You (Co-write) 
Tenek-Grayedout What Kind Of Friend 
Viv Ablertine The Vermilion Border (Mix/Add Production) 
Proxies TBC (Record/Mix/Production) 
John Foxx-Grayedout (remix/co-write) Interplay 
John Foxx-Grayedout (remix/co-write) Watching A Building on Fire
BT (remixer) Emergency 
Kovak (producer) 2nd album (end 2011)
Hard-Fi (producer) Killer Sounds 	        	
Lonsdale Boys Club (producer) Weekend  /Light me up 
Enter Shikari (producer/mix) Common Dreads
Glenn Morrison (remixer) Tokyo 
Radio Head (remixer) Nude
Enter Shikari (remixer) "We Can Breathe in Space, They Just Don't Want Us to Escape"
Kovak (producer) Heroes & High Heels
Carman Rizzo (remixer) Sirens
Enter Shikari (remixer) "Anything Can Happen in the Next Half Hour"
Carman Rizzo (remixer) Traveler in time
Nizyaz	(remixer) Nizyaz
Tears for Fears (remixer) Mad World
U2 (remixer) "Beautiful Day"
Moby (remixer and programmer) "Natural Blues"
Madonna (remixer) "What It Feels Like for a Girl”
Korn (remixer) "Did My Time”
Moody Blues (remixer) "Nights in White Satin”
Michael Andrews f/ Gary Jules	(remixer) "Mad World”
Gary Numan (keyboards / programming) Jagged
Syntax	 (producer) Strange days
Syntax	 (producer/writer) Bliss
Gary Numan (writer / producer) "Hybrid" album
Natacha Atlas (writer/producer) Something Dangerous 
Dave Matthews Band (remix) Perfecto mix
Bunkka (writer / producer) Oakenfold	Bunkka	
Fluke (Co-writer / producer) "2 bit Pie" album
Fluke	(producer) "Puppy" album
Gary Numan (remixer) "A Prayer for the Unborn'" 
Joi (remixer) "Deep Asia Vibes”
Big Brother (writer / producer) Big Brother Theme single
Quivver (add Prod & mix) "One Last Time"*
Mansun (remix programmer) "Disappoint You”
Genelab (remixer) "Out of My Head”
Ian Brown (remixer) "Golden Gaze”
Pet Shop Boys (remixer) "Go West" Euro 2000 album
Natalie Imbruglia (Co-writer) tracks
New Order (programmer) "Brutal" ('The Beach' OST)
Georgio Moroder (remixer) "The Chase”
Skip Raiders (remixer)	 "Another Day”
Tori Amos (programmer) tracks
Elizabeth Fraser (Co-writer/producer)	Underwater
Happy Mondays (programmer) "Boys Are Back in Town'”
21st Century Girls (Co-remixer) "21st Century Girls”
Republica
(co-prod / mix) "Rush Hour" single
(co-prod / mix) "Speed Ballads”
Rialto 
(co-prod / mix) "5.19" single
(co-prod / mix) "When We're Together'" 
Garbage (prog / mix) "Special" remix
The Aloof 
 (prog / mix) "Seeking Pleasure'" album
 (remixer) "What I Miss Most”
 (edit) "One Night Stand”
Tori Amos				
 (programmer) songs on From the Choirgirl Hotel
 (remix) "Raspberry Swirl" single
 (prog / edit) "Cruel" single 
BT
 (prog / edit	) ESCM album
 (remix) "Love, Peace & Grease" single
 (programmer) "Remember'" single
 (prog / mix) "MA" album
Quivver 
(programmer) "Blue Lights" single
(programmer) "Falling" single
Penguin Cafe Orchestra (remixer) "Telephone And Rubber Band" 
Mulu (remixer) "Filmstar" track
The Human League (programmer) "Octopus" album
East 17 (programmer) "Thunder'" single
Amoeba Assassin (writer / artist / prod) "Roller Coaster”

References

External links

Andy Gray on Discogs

English record producers
English electronic musicians
1970 births
Living people
Remixers